Boguty-Augustyny  is a village in the administrative district of Gmina Boguty-Pianki, within Ostrów Mazowiecka County, Masovian Voivodeship, in east-central Poland.

The village has a population of 50.

References

Boguty-Augustyny